"Enjoy Yourself" is a song recorded by the Jacksons and released as a single in 1976. Featuring Michael and Jackie Jackson on lead vocals, it was the first non-Motown single for the group since they departed from the label earlier that year. The song peaked at number 6 on the US Billboard Hot 100 songs chart on February 19, 1977. On other US charts, "Enjoy Yourself" peaked at number 2 on the Hot Soul Singles chart and number 33 on the National Disco Action Top 40 chart.  On February 14, 1989, it became the group's first single to be certified Platinum by the Recording Industry Association of America (RIAA) in the United States. It was also the group's first song to feature new member Randy Jackson, who replaced Jermaine Jackson when he decided to stay at Motown after his brothers left.

A music video, the Jacksons' first, was released in early 1977 to promote the single; it features the five Jackson brothers wearing white suits and dancing on a stage. It was released on DVD for the bonus disc of Michael Jackson's Vision.
The song was included on two of Michael's compilations, 2004's The Ultimate Collection and the US edition of The Essential Michael Jackson from 2005.

Background
The song is credited to Philadelphia songwriters/producers Gamble and Huff; however, a session musician from Gamble and Huff’s in-house band recalled that T.J. Tindall wrote the riff that was the initial spark for the song.

Record World said that "it's down right funky and tasteful enough to go all the way."

Charts

Certifications

References

External links
Google.com/books (page 68)

1976 songs
1976 singles
The Jackson 5 songs
Epic Records singles
Philadelphia International Records singles
Songs written by Kenny Gamble
Songs written by Leon Huff